Tomás Telis (born June 18, 1991) is a Venezuelan professional baseball catcher for the Tecolotes de los Dos Laredos of the Mexican League. He previously played in Major League Baseball (MLB) for the Texas Rangers and Miami Marlins.

Career

Texas Rangers
Telis signed with the Texas Rangers as an international free agent on July 2, 2007 as a shortstop and was moved to catcher. He made his professional debut in 2008 with the DSL Rangers. He split the 2009 season between the rookie ball AZL Rangers and the Low-A Spokane Indians, batting .330/.340/.498 between the two clubs. In 2010, Telis spent the year with the AZL Rangers, hitting .326/.351/.431 in 37 games. In 2011, Telis played for the Single-A Hickory Crawdads, slashing .297/.329/.430 with career-highs in home runs (11) and RBI (69). In 2012, Telis played in High-A with the Myrtle Beach Pelicans, posting a .247/.283/.331 batting line in 117 games. Telis spent the 2013 season with the Double-A Frisco RoughRiders, slashing .264/290/.353 with 4 home runs and 43 RBI in 91 games. Telis was assigned to the Triple-A Round Rock Express to begin the 2014 season.

Telis was called up to the majors for the first time on August 25, 2014. He made his debut that day against the Seattle Mariners as the starting catcher, and notched his first major league hit in the game, a bunt single off of Brandon Maurer. Telis appeared in 18 games for the Rangers, collecting 8 RBI's in 68 at bats.

Miami Marlins
On July 31, 2015, Telis was traded to the Miami Marlins, along with Cody Ege, for Sam Dyson. He finished the 2015 season between the Triple-A New Orleans Zephyrs and the Marlins, collecting 4 hits in 27 at-bats for the major league club. In 2016, Telis spent the majority of the season in New Orleans, but played in 10 games with Miami, notching 4 hits in 13 at-bats. In 2017, Telis played in 48 games for the Marlins, batting .240/.279/.346 with 9 RBI. After getting off to a .207/.258/.241 start in 2018, Telis was designated for assignment on April 28, 2018. He cleared waivers and was outrighted to the New Orleans Baby Cakes. Telis spent the remainder of the year in Triple-A and elected free agency on November 2, 2018.

Minnesota Twins
On January 9, 2019, Telis signed a minor league deal with the Minnesota Twins. He was assigned to AAA Rochester Red Wings to start the 2019 season, with whom he batted .330/.364/.490 in 82 games. On November 6, 2019, Telis re-signed with the Twins on a new minor league contract. Telis did not play in a game in 2020 due to the cancellation of the minor league season because of the COVID-19 pandemic. He again re-signed with the Twins on a minor league contract on November 2, 2020.

After the 2020 season, he played for Caribes de Anzoátegui of the Liga Venezolana de Béisbol Profesional(LVMP). He has also played for Venezuela in the 2021 Caribbean Series.

On April 21, 2021, Telis was selected to the active roster. However, on April 23, Telis was removed from the 40-man roster without making an appearance for the Twins and was assigned to the Triple-A St. Paul Saints.
Telis spent the 2021 season with the Triple-A St. Paul Saints. He played in 101 games, hitting .296 with 12 home runs and 50 RBI's. Telis became a free agent following the season.

Los Angeles Dodgers
On December 24, 2021, Telis signed a minor league contract with the Los Angeles Dodgers. He played in 80 games for the Triple-A Oklahoma City Dodgers, batting .287/.365/.342 with 2 home runs and 36 RBI. He elected free agency following the season on November 10, 2022.

Tecolotes de los Dos Laredos
On March 8, 2023, Telis signed with the Tecolotes de los Dos Laredos of the Mexican League.

See also
 List of Major League Baseball players from Venezuela

References

External links

1991 births
Living people
Arizona League Rangers players
Caribes de Anzoátegui players
Dominican Summer League Rangers players
Venezuelan expatriate baseball players in the Dominican Republic
Frisco RoughRiders players
Hickory Crawdads players
Major League Baseball catchers
Major League Baseball players from Venezuela
Miami Marlins players
Myrtle Beach Pelicans players
Navegantes del Magallanes players
New Orleans Baby Cakes players
Rochester Red Wings players
Round Rock Express players
Spokane Indians players
St. Paul Saints players
Texas Rangers players
Venezuelan expatriate baseball players in the United States
Oklahoma City Dodgers players
People from El Tigre